Myanmar has competed in every Southeast Asian Games since 1959.Myanmar hosted the games in 1961, 1969 and 2013 in Yangon and Naypyidaw.

History
Myanmar is one of the founding six countries of the SEAP Games.At that time, the country used the name Burma and so hosted the 2nd SEAP Games in 1961. Myanmar hosted 5th SEAP Games in 1969 for the second time.After that, due to political reasons, Myanmar was no longer hosted the games.However, sport delegations were sent annually.After 44 years later, Myanmar hosted again the 27th SEA Games in 2013.

Medal summary

See also
Myanmar at the Olympics
Myanmar at the Paralympics
Myanmar at the Asian Games
Myanmar at the Asian Para Games

References

SEA Games
Myanmar at the Southeast Asian Games